Music, Martinis, and Memories is a studio album by television personality, Jackie Gleason. It was originally released in 1954 on Capitol Records.  The orchestration consists of violins playing the melody while Bobby Hackett plays trumpet.

Music, Martinis and Memories reached No. 1 on Billboard magazine's pop album chart in October 1954.

AllMusic gave the album a rating of four stars. Reviewer Greg Adams described the music as "plain vanilla" and lacking in depth, serving as "fine dinner music" but failing to "hold the listener's attention when brought to the foreground."

Track listing 
Side A
 "Once in a While" (Bud Green, Michael Edwards)
 "I Can't Get Started" (Ira Gershwin, Vernon Duke)
 "I Got It Bad and That Ain't Good" (Duke Ellington, Paul Webster)
 "My Ideal" (Robin, Chase, Whiting)
 "Yesterdays" (Jerome Kern, Otto Harbach)
 I Love You (Je T'Aime!)" (Harlan Thompson, Harry Archer)
 "Unforgettable" (Irving Gordon)
 "How High the Moon" (Morgan Lewis, Nancy Hamilton)

Side B
 "I'll Be Seeing You" (Irving Kahal, Sammy Fain)
 "Shangri-La" (Matty Malnick, Robert Maxwell)
 "I Remember You" (Johnny Mercer, Victor Schertzinger)
 "It Could Happen to You" (James Van Heusen, Johnny Burke)
 "Somebody Loves Me" (MacDonald, DeSylva, Gershwin)
 "Time on My Hands (You in My Arms)" (Adamson, Gordon, Youmans)
 "The Nearness of You" (Hoagy Carmichael, Ned Washington)
 "The Song Is Ended" (Irving Berlin)

References

Jackie Gleason albums
1954 albums
Capitol Records albums